Infamy is a notoriety gained from ill repute (as opposed to fame).

Infamy may also refer to:

Infamy (album), a 2001 album by Mobb Deep
Infamy, a 2008 EP by Heaven Below
"Infamy", a song by The Rolling Stones from their 2005 album A Bigger Bang
Infamy, a measure of a player's skill in the game War Commander
"Infamy, infamy, they've all got it in for me", spoken by Kenneth Williams in the British comedy film Carry On Cleo (1964)

See also

A Universal History of Infamy, a collection of short stories by Jorge Luis Borge
Infamia, in ancient Roman culture, a loss of legal or social standing
 Infamous (disambiguation)
The Infamy Speech, delivered by U.S. President Roosevelt to Congress in 1941
Little Infamies, a 2002 collection of short stories by Panos Karnezis
Living in Infamy, a comic book miniseries by Ben Raab 
The Terror: Infamy, season 2 of the AMC-TV series The Terror